Newcombia pfeifferi is a species of air-breathing land snail, a terrestrial pulmonate gastropod mollusk in the family Achatinellidae. This species is endemic to Hawaii.

References

P
Biota of Molokai
Molluscs of Hawaii
Endemic fauna of Hawaii
Endangered fauna of Hawaii
Gastropods described in 1853
Taxonomy articles created by Polbot